Woodale is a hamlet in Coverdale in the Yorkshire Dales in England.  It lies in the civil parish of Carlton Highdale in the Richmondshire district of North Yorkshire. The River Cover flows nearby.

The name Woodale stems from Old English and means Valley of the Wolves.

The hamlet should not be confused with the even smaller settlement of Woodale in the parish of Stonebeck Up in upper Nidderdale.

References

Villages in North Yorkshire
Coverdale (dale)